Thandi Klaasen (born Thandiwe Nelly Mpambani, 27 September 1931 – 15 January 2017) was a jazz musician from Sophiatown, Gauteng. She was the mother of singer Lorraine Klaasen.

Biography
Thandiwe Nelly Mpambani grew up in Sophiatown, the daughter of a shoemaker and a domestic worker. When she was a teenager, she was attacked with an acid bomb and her face was permanently scarred. Her career as a singer and dancer began in the mid-1950s.

Klaasen performed with Dolly Rathebe, Miriam Makeba, Dorothy Masuka, and others. She died from pancreatic cancer on 15 January 2017, aged 85, and was given a state funeral.

Awards
Klaasen was awarded the Order of Ikhamanga in Gold (2006) for "excellent achievement in and contribution to the art of Music". In August 2013, as part of the Women's Month celebrations, Klaasen and four other icons of South African jazz - Abigail Kubeka, Dorothy Masuka, Sathima Bea Benjamin and Sylvia Mdunyelwa - were honoured by Standard Bank with lifetime achievement awards. Other awards she has received include the Woman of Distinction Award received in Canada (1999), and a lifetime achievement award at the 2006 South African Music Awards.

References

External links
South Africa history page
"At home with the legendary Thandi Klaasen", Drum, 3 March 2013.

1931 births
2017 deaths
20th-century South African women singers
South African jazz singers
Place of death missing
Deaths from pancreatic cancer